Salmah binti Ismail  (Jawi: سلمه بنت إسماعيل;
‎ 22 January 1935 – 25 April 1983), better known by her stage name Saloma, was a Malay Singaporean-Malaysian singer, film actress, trendsetter and a fashion icon of Banjar and Bawean descent who became well known in the late 1950s.

Saloma was well known for her vocal ability in singing, which was depicted as "lemak merdu", (a full, rather thick but sweet voice). She was signed with EMI music records and since then has released numerous EP's such as Dendang Saloma (1957), Bunga Negara (1963) and Aslirama (1972). Some of her most popular songs throughout her career including ‘Selamat Pengantin Baru’ and ‘Bila Larut Malam’

Saloma also ventures in acting careers when she acts in several films such as Azimat (1958) and Kaki Kuda (1958). Some of her most memorable works as an actress was in Seniman Bujang Lapok (1961) as Cik Salmah,  Ragam P. Ramlee (1964) and Ahmad Albab (1968) as Mastura.

Saloma was awarded the title Biduana Pertama Negara (First National Songbird) in 1978 for her contribution towards the music industry in Malaysia and the title Puan Sri in 1990, as the wife of Tan Sri Datuk Amar Dr. P. Ramlee.

Family and early life
Saloma was born on 22 January 1935 in Pasir Panjang, in Straits Settlement Singapore as Salmah binti Ismail to Ismail Osman and Umi Kalsom Mahban. She had seven siblings and was the third daughter in her family. She had an older sister, Siti Mariam binti Ismail, who was an actress, a younger paternal half-sister, Aminah Ismail (stage name Mimi Loma) and Jasmaniah Ismail, who is also a singer.

Saloma became the wife to the film actor, director, singer, songwriter, composer and producer Tan Sri Datuk Amar P. Ramlee when they got married in 1961.

During her childhood, Saloma enjoyed singing. She would usually share her thoughts of becoming a singer with her sister, Mariani. At the early age of five, Saloma was already singing with the local street bands. From there, her desire to become a singer grew even more.

Saloma's parents later divorced. Subsequently, Mariani and her followed their father to Tanjung Karang, Malaysia. Both of them then lived with their father and stepmother. During the World War II, they used to help their father in the paddy fields. Unable to cope with the changed situation, both of them ran back to Singapore without their father. After that, Saloma and her sister Mariani lived with their mother and stepfather, a person named Mum Yusoff. Mum Yusoff was a musician with a local keroncong party called The Singapore Boys that was contracted to perform at a club called The New World Cabaret. As Saloma had always talked about being a singer, her stepfather brought her to the cabaret one night and introduced her to the audience. She was then asked to perform the song "Seven Lonely Days" by Georgia Gibbs. Her singing style and voice impressed the audience there. She continued with a number of other songs and this was the beginning of her career as a singer. She was only 13 years old.

Career

Early career: 1949–1953
Saloma's voice began to play in the local radio when her stepfather brought her to see his orchestra perform on Radio Malaya. Singer Rokiah Hanafi, also known as Rokiah Wandah, was scheduled to sing several songs with the orchestra, but did not appear that day. Mum Yusoff decided to persuade Saloma to try singing the songs that were supposed to be sung by Rokiah. Fortunately, her performance was a success. After that, she received many offers from orchestras throughout Singapore to be their main singer. One of her songs that she sang at Radio Malaya was called "Sang Rang Bulan". The song was played in the film "Rachun Dunia" (Poison of This World) and was once recorded by a local singer named Rubiah.

In 1950, Saloma fell in love with the hero of a film called 'Aloha' after watching the film for the first time. The hero was played by P. Ramlee. At that time, Saloma was only 15 years and 11 months old. Her love for him grew stronger each day and Saloma swore that she would marry the actor one day. During the film blockbuster, P.Ramlee used to walk from his house to the studio. In the middle of the road, he had to walk pass Saloma's house in Mount Emily. Every time he walked towards the house, a Chinese boy selling grass jelly would run to Saloma 's house to tell her about the presence of her beloved hero. Saloma would then tease P. Ramlee by calling out "Banjo" (the character he played in the film) and then hid when he turned around to see who had called out to him.

During the early 1950s, her dream career to become a singer did not go the way she had wanted. Instead, she started her career as a film actress, offered by Nusantara Film. Her first film was entitled Pelangi (Rainbow), which received positive reviews among the audience. After that, she received a few offers from Nusantara Film to act in other films. In that period, she had acted in two other films, entitled 'Perkahwinan Rahsia' (Secret Wedding) and 'Norma'. In January 1952, she was offered a minor role as a club singer in a film called 'Chinta Murni' (True Love) by Nusantara Film, directed by Aman Ramlie or better known as A.R Tompel. At the time, it was her fourth film.

In April 1952, a few months after the release of Chinta Murni, Malay film fans were shocked by the news that announced her marriage with Aman Ramlie. At that time, Aman Ramlie was a well known director and comedian while she was only beginning to be recognised with the film 'Norma'. Their marriage lasted five months and they were divorced in September 1952 when Saloma was pregnant with their child.

According to her sister, Mariam, she was brought back to their house in Mount Emily to live with their mother. After her last film with Nusantara Film Company, titled Sesal Tak Sudah (Lasting Regret), Saloma immediately ended her contract with the company. The reason given was that she needed a rest because of her pregnancy and her refusal to work with her ex-husband any longer. At the end of 1952 until 1953, Saloma ended her career as a performer. In 1953, she gave birth to a son and only child, Armali Bin Aman Ramlie.

Restart: 1954–1960
After returning from her travel to Sarawak and Brunei on 23 July 1954, Saloma was offered by Pathe Company to record her voice. It was strongly supported by Syed Hamid, known as S.Hamid, who rose to fame at that time. They knew each other after acting in the film Sesal Tak Sudah. A song titled "Pandang Kasih" (Look of Love), composed by Rahmat Ali and lyrics by Ismadi, is a rumba-style while the song "Jika Tak Berjumpa" (If We Don't Meet) came from Arabic melodies which was then recomposed by S.Hussein Bagushir and lyrics by Wan Chu. Both of the songs were accompanied by Orkes Al Aishu Wal Meleh, conducted by S.Omar Bagushir. Saloma's first solo and also her first song recorded on vinyl by Pathe Company (numbered PTH 143) was "Pandang Kasih" while the song "Jika Tak Berjumpa" was her first duet with S.Hamid.

In 1955, Saloma was offered an acting role in a film by Studio Jalan Ampas which she accepted. Her first film with Studio Jalan Ampas was entitled Empat Isteri (Four Wives). This was last film directed by B.S. Rajhans. The film also starred Daeng Haris, Normadiah, Latifah Omar and Salmah's sister, Mariam (as Mariani). During the year, Salomah also recorded several songs including "Burong Punggok" (The Owl). In February 1956, she was offered to replace actress Siput Sarawak in the film Adekku (My Younger Sibling). There were rumours said that Siput Sarawak had quit after most of the movie scenes recorded.

After her success as a singer and also an actress, Shaw Brothers studio decided to give her a more commercial name. She got her stage name based on the film 'Salome' starring Rita Hayworth. In the same year, Saloma joined Panca Sitara, a band led by P. Ramlee.

International success: 1961–1968
Saloma began singing at the age of seven and was a professional singer by the time she was in her teenage years. Her singing was more in the style of Ella Fitzgerald and Doris Day. While she did become an actress later on, she always said she preferred singing to acting. As a singer, she sharpened her talents with Orkes Fajar Murni, led by Yusof Osman, during the early year of her career. She was also involved with another orchestra, Panca Sitara, in the 1960s.

Discography

Albums

“EP" Albums by Saloma

 Dendang Saloma (1957)
 Dendang Saloma Album II (1957)
 Dendang Saloma Album III (1959)
 Bunga Negara (1963)
 Saloma (Damak) (1964)
 Lagu-2 Sukaramai China Di Nyanyikan Oleh Saloma (1964)
 Saloma Dan Ahmad Daud (1964)
 Sekalung Sakura Dari Saloma (1965)
 Saloma (Pulau Menghijau) (1965)
 Gadis Langkawi (1966)
 Sudah Kawin Kah Belom/Kenangan Di Padang Kota (Saloma dan Ahmad Daud) 
 Guitar Berbunyi/Bintang Hati (Daripada Filem "Do-Re-Mi") (1966)
 Saloma (Menanti Kanda) (1967)
 Saloma (Aku Dia dan Lagu) (1968)
 Saloma (Entah Di Mana) (1969)
 Saloma (Chinchin Ku Ini) (1970)
 Saloma (Jangan Chemburu) (1971)
 Saloma (Aslirama) (1972)

Filmography

Films
Some memorable films acted by Saloma:

Illness and death
After the death of her husband, P. Ramlee, in 1973, Saloma was overwhelmed with grief and depression that took a toll on her health. It led her to suffer from a number of illnesses which caused her to look thin and sickly. She was admitted to Assunta Hospital, Petaling Jaya, Selangor before her death on 25 April 1983 at the age of 48 caused by liver failure associated with jaundice. She was buried at the Jalan Ampang Muslim Cemetery, Kuala Lumpur between the graves of her ex-husband Aman Ramlie and husband P. Ramlee.

Legacy

In 1978, she was awarded by the Malaysian government at Kecapi Awards as Biduanita Negara (National Songbird). To date, the late singer, Sharifah Aini, is the only other singer who had received the same honour.

The Saloma Bistro and Theatre Restaurant at Jalan Ampang, Kuala Lumpur was opened in 2003 and named after Saloma in honour of her contribution to the Malaysian entertainment industry. Furthermore, the Saloma Link, a pedestrian footbridge close to her grave, is also named after her. During her heyday, Saloma was also known as the 'Marilyn Monroe of the Asia', due to her ability to attract male adulation like the Hollywood actress Marilyn Monroe.
In 2014, a two-part film titled Saloma Part 1: Mencuri Guruh and Saloma Part 2: Pandang Kaseh'' was made and acted by Nabila Huda who played the role of Saloma. The film was available on Astro First for a limited time. Subsequently, the film was aired on Astro Mustika HD, Astro Citra and other movie-related channels on Astro Television.

Saloma was celebrated on a Google Doodle on 26 November 2020 as it appeared in Malaysia, which sparked discussion on social media about her true nationality when she died.

References

External links
 
 
 Saloma Bistro & Theatre Restaurant
 Saloma Profile,sinemamalaysia.com.my (Bahasa Malaysia)

1935 births
1983 deaths
Malaysian people of Malay descent
20th-century Malaysian actresses
20th-century Malaysian women singers
Malay-language singers
Malaysian film actresses
Parlophone artists
EMI Records artists
Singaporean film actresses
Singaporean emigrants to Malaysia
Malay Film Productions contract players
Merdeka Film Productions contract players